The Civil Nuclear Constabulary (CNC) (Welsh: Heddlu Sifil Niwclear) is a special police force responsible for providing law enforcement and security at any relevant nuclear site and for security of nuclear materials in transit within the United Kingdom. The force has over 1,500 police officers and support staff. Officers within the force are authorised firearms officers, due to the nature of the industry the force protects.

The CNC was established on 1 April 2005, replacing the former Atomic Energy Authority Constabulary established in 1955. The CNC does not guard the United Kingdom's nuclear weapons; this role is the responsibility of the British Armed Forces and the Ministry of Defence Police.

Role
The core role of the CNC is to provide armed policing and security for civil nuclear establishments and materials throughout the United Kingdom and to maintain a state of readiness against any possible attack on a licensed nuclear site.  The CNC is established in Chapter 3, sections 51–71, of the Energy Act 2004. The act sets up the Civil Nuclear Police Authority and the position of chief constable, defines the powers of members of the constabulary, mandates that His Majesty's Inspectorate of Constabulary must inspect the force and amends several other acts.  It falls under the remit of the Department for Business, Energy and Industrial Strategy instead of the Home Office.

The CNC's Annual Report for 20102011 (page 15) states that "... the crime dealt with by officers at civil nuclear sites remains low in volume. The management and investigation of crime does not form any part of the Constabulary's mission statement." Whilst the CNC are a police force, this acknowledgement would suggest the role of a CNC police officer is that of providing armed security, rather than primarily being concerned with law enforcement.  This role is also evidenced in the number of arrests made by the force annually compared with a territorial police force of a similar number of police officers.  In 2016, CNC officers made 24 arrests.  This compares to Dorset Police, a force with a similar number of officers who made 7,460 arrests annually in the latest annual figures.

During the year 20102011, the CNC made 12 arrests, although two of those people were de-arrested at the scene (one when it was realised that the person was not wanted on warrant after all and another where it was decided that police action was not appropriate in relation to an alleged assault).

From 1 October 2012 to 31 March 2019, the chief constable of the CNC was retired Brigadier Michael Griffiths.
The Deputy Chief Constable Simon Chesterman formerly of Thames Valley Police who is also the National Police Chiefs Council lead for firearms policing took over as chief constable.
The new temporary deputy chief constable is Chris Armitt formerly of Merseyside Police since 1989 who served eight years in the Royal Engineers.
The new temporary assistant chief constable is Duncan Worsell who has served with the force throughout his career. Previously he was North and Scotland divisional commander, operational unit commander at Sellafield and chief firearms instructor.

Unlike the majority of the British police territorial forces, all frontline CNC officers are routinely armed while carrying out duties. CNC officers also operate the armament on board the ships of the Pacific Nuclear Transport Limited, a subsidiary of International Nuclear Services, which specialise in transporting spent nuclear fuel and reprocessed uranium on behalf of its ultimate parent, the Nuclear Decommissioning Authority. Such ships have an onboard escort of armed police.

The CNC is authorised to carry out covert intelligence operations against anti-nuclear protesters. In July 2009, Judge Christopher Rose said the CNC's "approach to covert activity is conspicuously professional". He found that the system for storing the intelligence gained from informers was "working well" and that "senior officers regard covert surveillance as a long-term requirement".

Legal jurisdiction

 Any place when escorting nuclear materials in transit
 Any place when pursuing or detaining subjects who have unlawfully removed or interfered with materials guarded by the CNC, or have been reasonably suspected of being guilty of doing so
 Civil nuclear sites
 Land around such sites up to 5 km from the boundary.
 Shipyards when safeguarding such nuclear materials

See below section 'Mutual aid' when this jurisdiction can be extended in support of other forces.

Locations
The CNC operates at a total of ten sites in England, Scotland and Wales (there are no "relevant nuclear sites" in Northern Ireland). Of these, three are classed as Operational Units, where an ordinary police presence is maintained, while eight are Support Units, which have an overt armed police presence.
CNC Headquarters
Culham
Operational Units

Support Units

In 2007, the CNC adopted a structure similar to other police forces when it introduced three Basic Command Units, each headed by a superintendent, based around the geographical locations it polices. This has now changed to two, each headed by a chief superintendent as follows:
BCU North and Scotland – responsible for nuclear sites in Scotland (Dounreay, Hunterston and Torness) as well as nuclear sites in the north of England (Hartlepool, Heysham and Sellafield).
BCU South – responsible for nuclear sites in the south of England (Culham, Dungeness, Harwell, Hinkley Point and Sizewell).

Funding
Funding comes from the companies which run 10 nuclear plants in the UK. Around a third is paid by Nuclear Decommissioning Authority, which owns Sellafield. Nearly a fifth of the funding is provided by British Energy, the privatised company owned by EDF. In June 2009, EDF's head of security complained that the force had overspent its budget "without timely and satisfactory explanations to us". The industry acknowledges it is in regular contact with the CNC and the UK security services.

Mutual aid
The CNC is one of the three special police forces of the United Kingdom, the others being the British Transport Police, and Ministry of Defence Police.  Unlike these other two forces, the CNC were not included in the provisions setting out 'extended jurisdiction' as per the Anti-terrorism, Crime and Security Act 2001.  This allows officers of the MDP and BTP to act outside their natural jurisdiction in certain circumstances.

The CNC is also not included in mutual aid provisions provided by the Police Act 1996 sections 24 and 98 (mutual aid between police forces of England & Wales, Scotland, Northern Ireland and BTP) or Ministry of Defence Police Act 1987 section 3a (mutual aid from MDP).  However section 59 of the Energy Act 2004 allows CNC officers to act outside their natural jurisdiction in mutual aid situations under agreements between the chief officer of the CNC and the chief officer of a local police force.

In 2005, officers of the CNC were part of the police operation involving nearly all police forces of the United Kingdom in connection with the G8 conference near Gleneagles, Scotland.

Officers were seconded to Cumbria Constabulary as support during the floods of 2009.

On 2 June 2010, 27 CNC officers were deployed to assist Cumbria Constabulary in the manhunt for the gunman Derrick Bird. Along his route across West Cumbria, Bird killed 12 people and injured 25.

Officers have also been deployed to the 2012 London Olympics and 28 officers to a 2014 NATO conference in Wales.

For a period of three months during 2015, ten CNC officers were seconded to the British Transport Police's Counter Terrorism Support Unit in London. This detachment helped to cover the shortfall in firearms officer numbers in London in the wake of recent European terror attacks on major cities.

On 27 March 2016, The Daily Telegraph, post-Brussels terrorist attacks, stated: 'The Home Secretary has announced there will be a "surge" of more than 1,000 new armed police officers deployed across the country in the wake of the terrorist attacks in Brussels. Ms May has also changed the law to enable the 1,000 armed police officers guarding Britain's nuclear power stations to be redistributed in the event of multiple terror attacks.'

A press release from the CNC and Home Office details the changes made to enable a greater mutual aid role (dated 7 March 2016). It cites the CNC's Deputy Chief Constable Simon Chesterman: 'The signing of this collaboration agreement allows chief constables to formally request and receive CNC AFOs to work under his or her jurisdiction for the time period they require. Currently, CNC officers only have policing powers in a five-kilometre radius of a nuclear site, as laid out in the Energy Act 2004, and this agreement removes that restriction should officers be needed to provide support at any force across the country if circumstances require it.'

Following the Manchester Arena bombing on 22 May 2017, the force deployed in excess of 450 AFOs across the UK. This deployment occurred following the UK Threat Level being increased from severe to critical. Operation Temperer was activated and the military was deployed to backfill CNC officers at nuclear licensed sites. CNC officers were deployed to support Northumbria Police, Greater Manchester Police, Merseyside Police, South Yorkshire Police, West Yorkshire Police, Staffordshire Police, West Midlands Police, and South Wales Police.

The CNC were again deployed on Operation Temperer in 2017 following the 15 September Parsons Green train bombing. Although a shorter deployment it involved a larger number of officers deployed across the UK.

See also
List of law enforcement agencies in the United Kingdom, Crown Dependencies and British Overseas Territories
Law enforcement in the United Kingdom
Nuclear power in the United Kingdom
Specialist Firearms Officer

References

External links 
 

2005 establishments in the United Kingdom
Department of Energy and Climate Change
Nuclear energy in the United Kingdom
National police forces of the United Kingdom
Government agencies established in 2005
Specialist law enforcement agencies of the United Kingdom
Nuclear security agencies